Boronia cremnophila, commonly known as the Kimberley cliff boronia, is a plant in the citrus family, Rutaceae and is endemic to a small area in the Kimberley region of Western Australia. It is an erect or spreading shrub with both simple, and trifoliate leaves, and white sepals and petals, the sepals larger than the petals.

Description
It has both simple and trifoliate leaves but mostly trifoliate. The eight stamens are hairy with those nearest the petals slightly longer than those near the sepals.

Taxonomy and naming
Boronia cremnophila was first formally described in 2015 by Russell Barrett, Matthew Barrett and Marco Duretto and the description was published in Nuytsia from a specimen collected near Mount Elizabeth Station. The specific epithet (cremnophila) means "cliff-loving".

Distribution and habitat
This boronia grows is only known from a few locations near the Mount Elizabeth Station homestead where it grows in vertical rock fissures on small sandstone cliffs.

Conservation
Boronia cremnophila is classified as "Priority One" by the Government of Western Australia Department of Parks and Wildlife, meaning that it is known from only one or a few locations which are potentially at risk.

References

cremnophila
Flora of Western Australia
Plants described in 2015
Taxa named by Russell Lindsay Barrett
Taxa named by Marco Duretto
Taxa named by Matthew David Barrett